The Seal of Mindaugas is a medieval seal affixed to the October 1255 act by Mindaugas, King of Lithuania, granting Selonia to the Teutonic Knights. An academic debate is ongoing to determine authenticity of the act and the seal as they might have been forged by the Knights. If it is authentic then the seal is the only surviving contemporary depiction of Mindaugas. As the most important surviving artifact from Mindaugas' times, the seal was a centerpiece of a special exhibition organized by the National Museum of Lithuania in 2003 to commemorate the 750th anniversary of Mindaugas' coronation.

Act and seal
During an internal struggle in 1250, Mindaugas allied himself with the Livonian Order and the Teutonic Knights. With Orders' assistance he defeated his enemies, converted to Christianity, and was crowned as King of Lithuania in 1253. For their help, Mindaugas granted various lands to the Knights in 1253, 1255, 1257, 1259, 1260, and 1261. These six acts caused much controversy and debate among modern historians regarding their authenticity. Only one act, the October 1255 act concerning Selonia, survives with a seal of Mindaugas. The Selonian act was mentioned by Pope Alexander IV in a papal bull, dated July 13, 1257, confirming the territorial transfer. A transcript and detailed description of the seal was made in May 1393 by a papal legate. The 1393 description is an accurate representation of the surviving seal except for the string holding the seal to the parchment: according to the description the string was white and yellow while it is now white and blue. The original document is preserved by the Prussian Privy State Archives.

It depicts a ruler sitting on a bench, covered by a cushion or drapery. The ruler wears a royal mantle and a crown. The right arm holds a scepter decorated with a large lily, while the left arms holds an orb with a cross. The empty field around the figure is decorated with a Gothic diamond-shaped latticework. The diamonds have a tiny cross in the middle of them. The legend where Mindaugas' name and title should appear is almost completely chipped off. The only surviving details are a tiny cross, which would indicate the beginning of the legend's text, and a letter. The letter was variously read as M, D, or SI. According to the 1393 description, when the legend was still intact, it read + MYNDOUWE DEI GRA REX LITOWIE (Mindaugas by the grace of God King of Lithuania).

Scholarship

Already in the beginning of the 19th century, German historian Ernst Hennig raised doubts about authenticity of the act. These doubts were elaborated upon by Polish historian Juliusz Latkowski. He raised a theory that the act was forged around 1392–1393 during territorial disputes over Samogitia, but the seal was authentic – it was taken from another document by Mindaugas and affixed to the forged act. This hypothesis is bolstered by the fact that the wax used to fasten the seal to the parchment is of different color. Wojciech Kętrzyński paid special attention to the fact that seal's legend with Mindaugas's name and title is almost completely chipped off while the rest of the seal and the act are generally well-preserved. He arrived to the conclusion that the legend was destroyed on purpose. He further stipulated that the act was forged while Mindaugas was alive and that the seal belonged to a completely different person, perhaps Magnus III of Sweden or Andrew II of Hungary. Antoni Prochaska dismissed any doubts regarding authenticity based on the fact that the act was mentioned in a papal bull. Karol Maleczyński also rejected ideas about forgery and argued that at some point the seal fell off and was affixed anew thus explaining different color strings and wax used to fasten it. Lithuanian heraldic expert Edmundas Rimša analyzed heraldic aspects of the seal. He paid particular attention to the Gothic latticework, which appeared in European royal seals only in the 14th century. Rimša thus concluded that the seal is a forgery made at least 50 years after the supposed date of the act.

References

Seals (insignia)
13th century in Lithuania
1255 in Europe
13th century in the State of the Teutonic Order